The Puunēnē School, also known as Puunene School, is a historic school building in the community of Puunēnē in the central part of Maui, Hawaii, United States. Upon completion, it replaced an earlier four-room school on the site that was built to hold 350 students. The Classical Revival 1922 two-story concrete building became Maui's largest elementary school with about 1000 students. In the 1950s the area went into decline, and the building was used for special education classes. In 1979 it became an administrative annex for the Department of Education. It was added to the National Register of Historic Places listings in Hawaii on August 22, 2000.

In 1937 Puunene School science teacher Soichi Sakamoto began training boys in a Three Year Swim Club to compete for the 1940 Summer Olympics, which were originally scheduled to be held in Tokyo, Japan. Jose Balmores, Keo Nakama, "Bunny" Nakama, "Halo" Hirose, and Bill Smith swam 50-yd sprints against the 15 mph current (much clearer in those days) and went on to compete nationally but were never able to participate in the canceled 1940 and 1944 Olympics. However, Smith was finally able to win gold on the 400- and 800-meter relay team in the 1948 Olympics.
The coach and team's was described in a 2015 book.

References

School buildings on the National Register of Historic Places in Hawaii
Schools in Maui
School buildings completed in 1922
National Register of Historic Places in Maui County, Hawaii
1922 establishments in Hawaii
Hawaii Register of Historic Places